The Lewis Bandt Bridge is an Australian feature bridge over the Moorabool River, close to the southern end of Stage 2 of the Geelong Ring Road.

Section 2 from the Midland Highway to the Hamilton Highway at Fyansford, (along with Section 1), was officially opened on Sunday, 14 December 2008. Two days of torrential rain beforehand threatened to disrupt the opening, however it went ahead as planned after a cessation of the storm. The opening carried was out by Victorian Premier John Brumby, who announced the naming of the bridge as the Lewis Bandt Bridge, in honour of the Ford Australia engineer Lewis Bandt who is credited as the inventor of the coupé utility, in Geelong.

References

External links

Road bridges in Victoria (Australia)
Bridges completed in 2008
Concrete bridges in Australia
2008 establishments in Australia
Transport in Geelong
Buildings and structures in Geelong